Vimalanatha was the thirteenth Jain Tirthankara of the present age (Avasarpini). According to Jain beliefs, he became a Siddha, a liberated soul which has destroyed all of its karma. Vimalanatha was born to King Kratavarma and Queen Shyamadevi at Kampilya of the Ikshvaku dynasty. His birth date was the third day of the Magh Sukla month of the Indian calendar.

Biography
Vimalanatha was the thirteenth Jain Tirthankara of the present age (Avasarpini). According to Jain beliefs, he became a Siddha, a liberated soul which has destroyed all of its karma. Vimalanatha was born to King Kratavarma and Queen Shyama Devi at Kampilaji of the Ikshvaku dynasty. His birth date was the third day of the Magh Sukla month of the Indian calendar.

Famous Temples
 Kampilya Jain Temples at Kampilya, Uttar Pradesh: They are 1800 years old with a Bhagawan Vimalanatha idol around 2600 years old.
 Jain Derasar in Dubai
 Shri vimalnatha swami jain shwetambar temple in Bibwewadi, Maharashtra
 Shree Vimalnath Bhagwan Tirth in Dhule

Gallery

See also

God in Jainism
Arihant (Jainism)
Jainism and non-creationism

References

Sources
 
 
 

Tirthankaras